MUSICultures is a peer-reviewed academic journal formerly published as Canadian Journal for Traditional Music/La Revue de musique folklorique canadienne (1996–2002) and Canadian Folk Music Journal (1973–1996). The journal includes scholarly articles pertaining to Canadian, global, and transnational music.

Publications established in 1973
Cultural journals
Annual journals
Music journals
Folk music publications
English-language journals
French-language journals
Works about Canada

World music
Academic journals published by learned and professional societies of Canada